In glaciology, an ice cap is a mass of ice that covers less than  of land area (usually covering a highland area).

Description 
Ice caps are not constrained by topographical features (i.e., they will lie over the top of mountains). By contrast, ice masses of similar size that are constrained by topographical features are known as ice fields. The dome of an ice cap is usually centred on the highest point of a massif. Ice flows away from this high point (the ice divide) towards the ice cap's periphery. 

Ice caps have significant effects on the geomorphology of the area that they occupy. Plastic moulding, gouging and other glacial erosional features become present upon the glacier's retreat. Many lakes, such as the Great Lakes in North America, as well as numerous valleys have been formed by glacial action over hundreds of thousands of years.

Variants 

High-latitude regions covered in ice, though strictly not an ice cap (since they exceed the maximum area specified in the definition above), are called polar ice caps; the usage of this designation is widespread in the mass media and arguably recognized by experts.
Vatnajökull is an example of an ice cap in Iceland.

Plateau glaciers are glaciers that overlie a generally flat highland area. Usually the ice overflows as hanging glaciers in the lower parts of the edges. An example is Biscayarfonna in Svalbard.

See also

 Glacier
 Iceberg
 Ice cap climate
 Ice core
 Ice shelf
 List of glaciers in Russia
 Sea ice

References